Lamiomimus is a genus of longhorn beetles of the subfamily Lamiinae, containing the following species:

 Lamiomimus chinensis Breuning, 1936
 Lamiomimus gottschei Kolbe, 1886

References

Lamiini